Crissle West is an American writer and comedian. She is best known as the co-host of the pop culture podcast The Read. She has starred in episodes of Drunk History, on which she has told the story of Harriet Tubman's work as a Union spy during the Civil War, as well as Marsha P. Johnson and the Stonewall riot.

Career
West was born in Louisiana and raised in Tulsa, Oklahoma, graduating from Booker T. Washington 
high school in 2000. She graduated from the University of Oklahoma in 2004.  In Oklahoma, she met future The Read co-host Kid Fury first on Twitter, then in person during a trip to Atlanta in 2012. West moved to New York City shortly thereafter and worked first at a magazine, and then as an executive assistant.

The Read

Two months after West moved to New York, Kid Fury approached her about starting a podcast through the Loud Speakers Network; the show, named The Read, quickly gained traction. iTunes featured The Read on its Best of 2013 list and as an Editors' Choice pick in 2014. Slate named one episode to its list of "Best 25 Podcast Episodes of All Time," and The Verge named The Read to its list of podcasts "you should be listening to." The Read also won best podcast at the 2014 Black Weblog Awards.

Together West and Kid Fury were named to The Grio'''s 100, which said "the unabashedly profane duo take 'throwing shade' to a new level on a weekly basis leaving their fans in stitches and shaking their heads in disbelief."The Read was adapted into a television show on Fuse TV that premiered in October 2019.

Comedy and other media
West has been noted for her trenchant critiques of racism. She drew national attention for a WNYC-hosted panel "Funny or Racist" where she dismantled an argument defending blackface.

West is also a comedian, notably appearing with Octavia Spencer on Comedy Central's Drunk History series in "a surprisingly-hilarious retelling" of Harriet Tubman's work as a Union spy during the Civil War. Salon called the episode one of 2015's "best moments in political comedy." In 2016, West narrated an episode of Drunk History honoring National Coming Out Day, recounting Sylvia Rivera and Marsha P. Johnson's role in the Stonewall Riots. The A.V. Club said the episode "schools Hollywood in telling LGBT stories," as "West, who was one of last season's best narrators, returns with another memorable, powerful retelling."

West was also a host on Beats 1 Radio, part of Apple Music, and has written for Essence. Madame Noire calls her "one of the people we wish were our friends. She's just that cool, really."

West appeared on the second season of late-night show Uncommon Sense with Charlamagne Tha God on MTV2.

Alongside Francheska Medina, West co-hosts Insecuritea: The Insecure Aftershow'', the official recap podcast for the HBO series Insecure. The fourth season was nominated for a Shorty Social Good award in the Podcast category at the 13th Shorty Awards.

Personal life 
West is queer. She is presently in school pursuing a degree in Clinical Mental Health Counseling.

Filmography

Accolades

References

External links 
 Official website 
 

Living people
American podcasters
American LGBT entertainers
LGBT African Americans
Place of birth missing (living people)
American women writers
American women comedians
Comedians from Oklahoma
1982 births
African-American female comedians
21st-century African-American women
American women podcasters
Queer women
20th-century African-American people
21st-century American LGBT people
20th-century African-American women